Knotty Ash & Stanley railway station was located on the North Liverpool Extension Line to the north of the East Prescot Road, Knotty Ash, Liverpool, England.

The station opened in 1879 as "Old Swan & Knotty Ash". It was renamed "Knotty Ash & Stanley" in 1888, but it was always referred to locally simply as "Knotty Ash". The station nameboards read "Knotty Ash".

It closed to passengers on 7 November 1960, to general goods in 1965 and completely in 1972.

The line through the station was used by freight trains until 1975, the tracks were lifted in early 1979.

By 2015 the trackbed though the station site formed part of the Trans Pennine Trail.

References

Sources

External links
 The station's history Disused Stations UK
 The station on a 1948 O.S. map npe Maps
 The station on an 1888 OS map overlay National Library of Scotland
 The station and line HTS railwaycodes
 The trackbed Sustrans

Disused railway stations in Liverpool
Former Cheshire Lines Committee stations
Railway stations in Great Britain opened in 1879
Railway stations in Great Britain closed in 1972
1879 establishments in England
1972 disestablishments in England